Hungary competed at the 2018 European Championships which last from 2 to 12 August 2018. Hungary competed in 6 sports.

Medal summary

Medal table

|  style="text-align:left; width:75%; vertical-align:top;"|

|  style="text-align:left; width:25%; vertical-align:top;"|

Athletics

Hungary participates with 33 competitors (15 men, 18 women) at the 2018 European Athletics Championships.

Aquatics

Swimming
Men

Women

Mixed team events

Synchronized swimming

Open water swimming

Men

Women

Team

Cycling

Track
Men
Sprints

Omnium

Points race

Mountain biking

Gymnastics
Men
Team

Women
Team

Men individual finals

Women individual finals

Rowing
Men

Women

Qualification Legend: FA=Final A (medal); FB=Final B (non-medal); FC=Final C (non-medal); FD=Final D (non-medal); FE=Final E (non-medal); FF=Final F (non-medal); SA/B=Semifinals A/B; SC/D=Semifinals C/D; SE/F=Semifinals E/F; QF=Quarterfinals; R=Repechage

Triathlon

References

External links
 European Championships official site 

2018
Nations at the 2018 European Championships
2018 in Hungarian sport